Seetha Man Awa is a 2013 Sri Lankan Sinhala comedy, family film directed by Jayasekara Aponso and produced by Chaminda Ranasinghe. This is Aponso's second direction. It stars Bandu Samarasinghe, and Jayasekara Aponso in lead roles along with Sanoja Bibile, Rodney Warnakula and Kumara Thirimadura. Music for the film is done by renowned musician Rohana Weerasinghe. It is the 1195th Sri Lankan film in the Sinhala cinema.

Plot

Cast
 Bandu Samarasinghe as Rama 
 Jayasekara Aponso as Ravana
 Chanchala Warnasooriya as Sita
 Sanoja Bibile as film directress
 Rodney Warnakula as guide
 Kumara Thirimadura
 Bandula Wijeweera
 Sarath Kulanga
 Jeevan Handunnetti
 Don Guy
 Ranjith Silva as Haramanis "Hanuma"

Soundtrack

References

External links
‘සීතා මං ආවා’ චිත්‍රපට මාෆියාවට අහු වුණාද?

2013 films
2010s Sinhala-language films